Zhengzhou No.1 High School (Chinese: 郑州市 第一 中学 Zhèng-zhōu-shì dì-yī zhōng-xué) is also called Zhengzhou No.1 Middle School. It is a high school for both junior and senior students in Zhengzhou, Henan, China. It is one of the 16 Provincial Beacon High Schools in Zhengzhou. The school fosters spirits of student-oriented and self-development. The aim of school is to increase students' freedom, improve class efficiency, reduce students' burden, and cultivate the innovative spirit. Zhengzhou No.1 High School is constantly ranked among top 50 high schools in China, due to its  achievements in math and science Olympiad Competitions, and it is considered the most successful secondary school in the province of Henan. 
It is located in Zhongyuan Xi Road, Zhongyuan District.

Zhengzhou No.1 High School is of high quality of teaching. Every year there are about nine-hundred students graduating from this famous high school, and more than 92 percents of them are accept by one class universities in China. Zhengzhou No.1 High School is an outstanding integrated-development high school which not only emphasizes on academic aspect but also on students' development in all respects. School encourages students to join in variegated clubs running by student themselves and gives the club both mental and economic supports. Every school holds chorus competition to  memorize revolutionary martyrs.

History
The School was founded on March 5, 1949. It combined urban No.1 Middle School, No.2 Middle School and private "MingXin" Middle School in Zhengzhou. It was named the high school of Zhengzhou City. Qi Luyu, the minister of publicity department of Zhengzhou city government was appointed as the inaugural headmaster. At that time, there were only seven classes, 249 students in total and 26 teachers and staff members.
In March, 1953, the scale expanded and changed its name into "Zhengzhou No.1 Advanced School in Henan Province"

In August 1956, the school moved to Nanyang Road in Zhengzhou.

In 1959, it was identified as one of the key middle schools in Zhengzhou.

In 2005, Zhengzhou No. 1 Middle School had constructed a new campus of about 331 mus in Zhongyuan Xi Road.

In 2007, it was identified as one of the top 100 middle schools in China.

Today there are over 2,500 students studying and about 200 teachers and staff members working at the school.

Current School Leaders
Headmaster: Han Song.
Deputy Headmaster: BaoJian He,  JianJun Guo and  Yiling Zhang.
Secretary: Wu JianCai.

Associations and Clubs
"XinYun" poem club

"Xinquan" literature club

"Xinhui" drawing club

"Xinyi" Chess Club

"Xinwu" Dancing Club

"Youth Melody" School Chorus

 "Xiwachuooo" Asian Club

 Campus Radio Station

 Campus Journalistic Station

 The association of the shutterbug

 Model United Nation Club

Gallery

References

External links
Official website of Zhengzhou No.1 High School

Education in Zhengzhou
High schools in Henan
Educational institutions established in 1949
1949 establishments in China